The meridian 38° west of Greenwich is a line of longitude that extends from the North Pole across the Arctic Ocean, Greenland, the Atlantic Ocean, South America, the Southern Ocean, and Antarctica to the South Pole.

The 38th meridian west forms a great circle with the 142nd meridian east.

From Pole to Pole
Starting at the North Pole and heading south to the South Pole, the 38th meridian west passes through:

{| class="wikitable plainrowheaders"
! scope="col" width="120" | Co-ordinates
! scope="col" | Country, territory or sea
! scope="col" | Notes
|-
| style="background:#b0e0e6;" | 
! scope="row" style="background:#b0e0e6;" | Arctic Ocean
| style="background:#b0e0e6;" |
|-
| style="background:#b0e0e6;" | 
! scope="row" style="background:#b0e0e6;" | Lincoln Sea
| style="background:#b0e0e6;" |
|-
| 
! scope="row" | 
|Cape Washington
|-
| style="background:#b0e0e6;" | 
! scope="row" style="background:#b0e0e6;" | Hunt Fjord
| style="background:#b0e0e6;" |
|-
| 
! scope="row" | 
|Roosevelt Land
|-
| style="background:#b0e0e6;" | 
! scope="row" style="background:#b0e0e6;" | Harder Fjord
| style="background:#b0e0e6;" |
|-
| 
! scope="row" | 
|Amundsen Land and Hans Tausen Ice Cap
|-
| style="background:#b0e0e6;" | 
! scope="row" style="background:#b0e0e6;" | Sermilik Fjord
| style="background:#b0e0e6;" |
|-
| 
! scope="row" | 
| Ammassalik Island
|-
| style="background:#b0e0e6;" | 
! scope="row" style="background:#b0e0e6;" | Atlantic Ocean
| style="background:#b0e0e6;" |
|-valign="top"
| 
! scope="row" | 
| Ceará Rio Grande do Norte — from  Paraíba — from  Pernambuco — from  Alagoas — from  Sergipe — from  Bahia — for about 2 km from  Sergipe — from  Bahia — from  Sergipe — from  Bahia — for about 4 km from  Sergipe — from  Bahia — from 
|-
| style="background:#b0e0e6;" | 
! scope="row" style="background:#b0e0e6;" | Atlantic Ocean
| style="background:#b0e0e6;" |
|-valign="top"
| 
! scope="row" | 
| Island of South Georgia
|-
| style="background:#b0e0e6;" | 
! scope="row" style="background:#b0e0e6;" | Atlantic Ocean
| style="background:#b0e0e6;" |
|-
| style="background:#b0e0e6;" | 
! scope="row" style="background:#b0e0e6;" | Southern Ocean
| style="background:#b0e0e6;" |
|-valign="top"
| 
! scope="row" | Antarctica
|-
|}

See also
37th meridian west
39th meridian west

w038 meridian west